Compliments, also known as Garcia, is Jerry Garcia's second solo album, released in 1974. It includes one newly written song by John Kahn and Robert Hunter but is otherwise composed of cover versions. The album peaked at number 49 on the Billboard chart.

Compliments was reissued on 180-gram green vinyl, in a limited edition of 7,000 copies, as part of Record Store Day on April 18, 2015.

Track listing
"Let It Rock" (Chuck Berry) – 3:12
"When The Hunter Gets Captured by the Game" (Smokey Robinson) – 3:46
"That's What Love Will Make You Do" (Henderson Thigpen, James Banks, Eddy Marion) – 3:42
"Russian Lullaby" (Irving Berlin) – 3:04
"Turn On The Bright Lights" (Albert Washington) – 5:04*
"He Ain't Give You None" (Van Morrison) – 3:25
"What Goes Around" (Mac Rebennack) – 3:07
"Let's Spend The Night Together" (Mick Jagger, Keith Richards) – 3:40
"Mississippi Moon" (Peter Rowan) – 3:06
"Midnight Town" (Robert Hunter, John Kahn) – 3:12
The album was reissued in the All Good Things: Jerry Garcia Studio Sessions box set with the following bonus tracks:
<li>"That's a Touch I Like" (Jesse Winchester) – 3:40
<li>"(I'm a) Road Runner" (Brian Holland, Lamont Dozier, Eddie Holland) – 4:10
<li>"It's Too Late (She's Gone)" (Chuck Willis) – 4:27
<li>"I'll Forget You" (copyright control) – 3:21
<li>"Tragedy" (Fred Burch, Gerald Nelson) – 3:52
<li>"Think" (Deadric Malone, Jimmy McCracklin) – 4:12
<li>"I Know It's a Sin" (Jimmy Reed) – 2:41
<li>"Lonesome Town" (Thomas Baker Knight) – 6:19
<li>"Cardiac Arrest (Studio Jam)" (Garcia, Kahn, Michael Omartian, Merl Saunders, Ron Tutt) – 1:39
<li>"Back Home in Indiana" (James Hanley, Ballard McDonald) – 7:08
Although credited to Albert Washington on this album, the song "Turn On the Bright Lights" is credited on the original Albert Washington 45 rpm single to musician, producer, and songwriter Harry Carlson.

Personnel

Musicians
Jerry Garcia – guitar, vocals, classical guitar
Arthur Adams – guitar
Michael Omartian – piano, tack piano, Fender Rhodes
John Kahn – bass, horn arrangement, string arrangement
Ron Tutt – drums
Merl Saunders – organ
Larry Carlton – guitar

Production
John Kahn – producer
Ron Malo – engineer
Richard Loren – production assistant
Joshua Blardo – production assistant
Ramrod – equipment
Steve Parrish – equipment
Victor Moscoso – cover artwork

Additional personnel

Bobbye Hall – percussion on tracks 1-3 and 7-8
Melvin Moore – trumpet on tracks 3 and 5
Gene Connors – trombone on tracks 3 and 5, horn arrangement
Jackie Kelso – saxophones on tracks 3 and 5
Amos Garrett – trombone on tracks 4 and 7
Joel Tepp – clarinet on track 4
Richard Greene – violin on tracks 4 and 8
Merry Clayton – background vocals on tracks 6 and 10
Clydie King – background vocals on tracks 6 and 10
Patty – background vocals on tracks 6 and 10
Geoff Muldaur – clarinet on track 7
Maria Muldaur – background vocals on track 8
Ben Benay – rhythm guitar on track 9
Tom Rose – clarinet on track 9
John Rotella – e flat clarinet on track 9
Willie Green – b flat clarinet on track 9
Gary Ray – b flat clarinet on track 9
Julian Sheer – bass clarinet on track 9
Sid Page – violin on tracks 9-10
Carl Pedersen – violin on tracks 9-10
Nathan Rubin – violin on tracks 9-10
Emily van Valkenburg – violin on tracks 9-10
Miriam Dye – viola on tracks 9-10
Nancy Ellis – viola on tracks 9-10
Terry Adams – cello on tracks 9-10
Judiyaba – cello on tracks 9-10
Ray Siegal – string bass on tracks 9-10
Arnie Egilsson – string bass on tracks 9-10
Sid Sharp – contractor on tracks 9-10
David Nichtern – guitar on track 20
David Grisman – mandolin on track 20
Vassar Clements – violin on track 20

References

Jerry Garcia albums
1974 albums